Steven William Schubert (born March 15, 1951) is a former American football wide receiver in the National Football League. He played in six seasons in the NFL (1974-1979) for the New England Patriots and Chicago Bears. He played college football for the UMass Minutemen.

Schubert caught the only touchdown that the Bears scored in their 37-7 loss to the Dallas Cowboys in the 1977 NFC Divisional playoff game. It was the Bears' first postseason game in 14 years, since they won the 1963 NFL Championship Game in 1963 against the New York Giants.

Early life and career
Schubert was born in Brooklyn, New York, to Charles Schubert Jr. and Alice Pappas.

References

1951 births
Living people
American people of Finnish descent
American football wide receivers
New England Patriots players
Chicago Bears players
UMass Minutemen football players